Jurong Stadium was a multi-purpose stadium in Jurong, Singapore, the stadium held 8,000 people.  

It was used mostly for football matches and was the home stadium of Sinchi FC when they played in the S.League from 2003 to 2005. Previously, Warriors FC (then known as Singapore Armed Forces FC) also played their home games in the stadium, before moving to Choa Chu Kang Stadium.

In February 2020, Jurong Stadium was fenced up, before being demolished in March 2020, with demolition ending in the same month.

References

External links 

Sports venues in Singapore
Football venues in Singapore
Jurong West
Multi-purpose stadiums in Singapore
Singapore Premier League venues
Sports venues demolished in 2020
2020 disestablishments in Singapore
Demolished buildings and structures in Singapore